The Yigo Guam Temple is a temple of the Church of Jesus Christ of Latter-day Saints (LDS Church) in Yigo, Guam.

History 
The intent to construct the temple was announced by church president Russell M. Nelson on October 7, 2018. The Yigo Guam Temple was announced concurrently with 11 other temples. At the time, the number of the church's total number of operating or announced temples was 201.

On May 4, 2019, a groundbreaking to signify beginning of construction was held, with Yoon Hwan Choi, who was then president of the church's Asia North Area, presiding. On January 12, 2022, the LDS Church announced that a public open house is scheduled for May 4 through 14, 2022, excluding Sunday.  The temple was dedicated by David A. Bednar on May 22, 2022. The temple was built to serve 9,600 members living in Micronesia, including Saipan, Guam, Palau, and the Federated States of Micronesia.

See also 

 Comparison of temples of The Church of Jesus Christ of Latter-day Saints
 List of temples of The Church of Jesus Christ of Latter-day Saints
 List of temples of The Church of Jesus Christ of Latter-day Saints by geographic region
 Temple architecture (Latter-day Saints)

References

External links
Church Newsroom of The Church of Jesus Christ of Latter-day Saints

Yigo Guam Temple at ChurchofJesusChristTemples.org

Temples (LDS Church) in Asia
Proposed religious buildings and structures of the Church of Jesus Christ of Latter-day Saints
The Church of Jesus Christ of Latter-day Saints in Guam
Religious buildings and structures in Guam
Religious buildings and structures completed in 2022
21st-century Latter Day Saint temples
2022 establishments in Guam